Mircea Ionnițiu (sometimes incorrectly spelled "Ioanițiu" or "Ioannițiu") (born date unknown, Bucharest – November 13, 1990, Woodland Hills, California, United States) was a Romanian writer, author of memorial notes.

In his adolescence, he was a member of the Palatine Class, a special class of pupils that was formed upon the request of King Carol II of Romania, for the education of his only son, Prince Michael (proclaimed king as Michael I in 1940).

Around 1944, Mircea Ionnițiu was a personal secretary of King Michael I. In this job, he was a direct witness of the August 23rd events, of the imposition of the first Petru Groza cabinet through Soviet pressure (March 6, 1945) and of the king's forced abdication on December 30, 1947.

Mircea Ionnițiu left Romania on January 3, 1948, in the Royal Train, together with the Royal Family of Romania that was departing in forced exile.

Later, in 1984, he wrote his memories about these historical events in his book Amintiri și reflecțiuni ("Memories and Reflections"), published by Editura Enciclopedică in 1993.

Bibliography
 Mircea Ionnițiu - Amintiri și reflecțiuni, Editura Enciclopedică, 1993, 
 Tudor Vișan-Miu - La școală cu Regele Mihai. Povestea Clasei Palatine, Editura Corint, 2016, 
 Nicolae Drăgușin - Abdicarea forțată a Regelui Mihai, in România Liberă'', January 4, 2008

References

1990 deaths
Romanian writers
Year of birth missing